Wabash Combination Depot-Shenandoah, also known as the Shenandoah Wabash Depot, is an historic building located in Shenandoah, Iowa, United States. The depot was built in 1903, and replaced a smaller and older structure. It was designed by and served the Wabash Railroad as a combination passenger and freight station. The Queen Anne and Stick-Eastlake style station was a standard design used by the railroad. The single-story, frame structure features a gabled roof and wide, overhanging eaves. It was an island station that sat in the midst of the tracks. The rear track was used for loading and unloading freight, while the main line rails were along the front. The depot was acquired by the Wabash Trace Nature Trail from the Iowa Southern Railway. The Wabash Trace relocated it to Sportsman's Park in Shenandoah, along the Burlington Northern tracks. The depot was listed on the National Register of Historic Places in 1990.

References

Railway stations in the United States opened in 1903
Queen Anne architecture in Iowa
Stick-Eastlake architecture in Iowa
Transportation buildings and structures in Page County, Iowa
National Register of Historic Places in Page County, Iowa
Railway stations on the National Register of Historic Places in Iowa
Former railway stations in Iowa
Former Wabash Railroad stations